

Seeds

  Thiemo de Bakker (semifinals)
  Donald Young (third round)
  Alexandre Sidorenko (first round)
  Luka Belić (second round)
  Nicolás Santos (first round)
  Jonathan Eysseric (second round)
  Sanam Singh (second round)
  Petru-Alexandru Luncanu (semifinals)
  Lee Hsin-han (third round)
  Ivan Sergeyev (third round)
  Albert Ramos (third round)
  Roman Jebavý (first round)
  Sho Aida (first round)
  Kevin Botti (second round)
  Robin Roshardt (quarterfinals)
  Antonio Veić (first round)

Draw

Final eight

Top half

Section 1

Section 2

Section 3

Section 4

Sources
ITF Tennis

Boys' Singles
2006